Manduca franciscae is a moth of the  family Sphingidae.

Distribution 
It is known from Venezuela.

Description 
The length of the forewings is 42–47 mm for males and about 55 mm for females. It is similar in appearance to several other members of the genus Manduca, but whiter than any other species in the genus with the exception of Manduca sexta leucoptera. The forewing underside is light brown, shading to white, the hindwing upperside is brown and the hindwing underside is white, except for the light brown antemedian and submarginal bands. Females are darker and more contrastingly patterned than males.

References

Manduca
Moths described in 1916